John Millman was the defending champion, but lost in the quarterfinals to James Duckworth.

Kwon Soon-woo won his first ATP Tour title, defeating Duckworth in the final, 7–6(8–6), 6–3. Kwon became the first South Korean player to win a title at ATP Tour level since Lee Hyung-taik in the 2003 Sydney tournament.

Seeds
The top four seeds received a bye into the second round.

Draw

Finals

Top half

Bottom half

Qualifying

Seeds

Qualifiers

Qualifying draw

First qualifier

Second qualifier

Third qualifier

Fourth qualifier

References

External links
Main draw
Qualifying draw

2021 ATP Tour